The 1998–99 season was Reading's 128th year in existence and first season back in the Second Division, since the 1993–94 season, and covers the period from 1 July 1998 to 30 June 1999. Reading finished the season in 11th position, were knocked out of the FA Cup at the First Round by Stoke City, the Football League Cup by Barnsley in the Second Round and the First Round of the Football League Trophy by Bournemouth. It was the club's first full season with Tommy Burns as manager, and their first at their new Madejski Stadium.

Season events

Squad

Left club during season

Transfers

In

Loan in

Out

Released

Results

Second Division

Results

League table

FA Cup

League Cup

League Trophy

Squad statistics

Appearances and goals

|-
|colspan="14"|Players away on loan:
|-
|colspan="14"|Players who appeared for Reading but left during the season:

|}

Goal scorers

Clean sheets

Disciplinary record

Notes

References

Soccerbase.com

Reading F.C. seasons
Reading